Inezgane Airport or Agadir Inezgane Airport  is an airport in Agadir, the capital city of the Souss-Massa region in Morocco. After being replaced by the Al Massira airport for civilian service, it is now a military air base.

Facilities

Incidents

On August 3, 1975, an Alia Royal Jordanian Airlines Boeing 707 struck a mountain peak when on approach to Agadir Airport. All 188 passengers and crew on board were killed. It is the worst ever incident involving a 707.

World War II
During World War II, the airport was used by the United States Army Air Forces Air Transport Command as a hub for cargo, transiting aircraft and personnel on the North African Cairo–Dakar transport route for cargo, transiting aircraft and personnel.  It functioned as a stopover en route to Marrakech Airport or to Dakhla Airport, near Villa Cisneros in French North Africa.  In addition, an air connection to Atar Airport also handled cargo and personnel flights.

Civilian service and military air base
After the war, Inezgane was the civilian airport of Agadir until 1991, when it was replaced by the new Agadir–Al Massira 20 km southwest of the city. Then it was converted back into a Moroccan military air base.

References

External links
 

Airports in Morocco
Airport, Inezgane
Buildings and structures in Souss-Massa
Airfields of the United States Army Air Forces Air Transport Command in North Africa
World War II airfields in Morocco